Bobbits Lane is a  Local Nature Reserve in Ipswich in Suffolk. It is owned by Ipswich Borough Council and managed by the Greenways Countryside Project.

In the reserve, grassy paths run through wet meadows. Fauna include otters, water voles, kingfishers, egrets and toads.

There is access to the site from Stoke Park Drive.

References

Local Nature Reserves in Suffolk